The 2018 ITTF Pan-America Cup was a table tennis competition that took place from 15–17 June in Asunción, Paraguay. The event was organised by the Paraguay Table Tennis Federation, under the authority of the International Table Tennis Federation (ITTF). It was the second edition of the event.

Men's singles and women's singles events were held, with the winners and runners-up in each event qualifying automatically for the 2018 Men's and Women's World Cups.

Medallists

Men's singles

Seeding

Players were seeded according to the June 2018 ITTF World Ranking.

Group stage

Main draw

Women's singles

Seeding

Players were seeded according to the June 2018 ITTF World Ranking.

Group stage

Main draw

See also

 2018 Pan American Table Tennis Championships
 2018 Europe Top 16 Cup
 2018 ITTF-ATTU Asian Cup
 2018 ITTF-Oceania Cup

References

External links

Official website 

Pan American Table Tennis Cup
Pan-America Cup
ITTF Pan-America Cup
Table tennis competitions in Paraguay
International sports competitions hosted by Paraguay
Sport in Asunción
ITTF Pan-America Cup